C. Bradley Hutto (born August 6, 1957), is an American politician currently serving as a Democratic member of the South Carolina Senate, representing the Senate District  40 since 1996. Senate District 40 encompasses all or portions of the counties of Allendale, Bamberg, Barnwell, Colleton, Hampton, and Orangeburg.

Early life and career
He is a 1978 graduate of the Honors College of the University of South Carolina and a 1981 graduate of the Georgetown University Law Center. Since 1982, he has practiced law with the firm of Williams & Williams in Orangeburg, S.C.

Brad Hutto is an Eagle Scout and well known for contributions to the Boy Scouts of America having served at the unit level as a Cubmaster of Pack 90.  Brad Hutto serves on the Executive Board of the Indian Waters Council, BSA and served as Council President from 2009 to 2011.  He is a vigil honor member in Muscogee Lodge, Order of the Arrow where he served as Lodge Chief in 1975. His Scouting recognitions include: Distinguished Eagle Scout, Silver Beaver, Order of the Arrow Founder's Award, and Centurion Award.

U.S. Senate campaign

Hutto filed to run for Senator Lindsey Graham's seat in the United States Senate in 2014. He announced his candidacy on March 28, 2014, saying that a "bruising primary" shaping up between Graham and Republican challengers "would give me an opening" in the race despite South Carolina's strong conservative lean. Hutto also criticized Graham for his frequent television appearances and said he would campaign to represent South Carolina's rural interests and communities.

On May 28, 2014, the South Carolina Democratic Party's executive committee voted unanimously to endorse Hutto in the primary election over candidate Jay Stamper.

State senate
His is the only Senate District that includes six county seats. Hutto serves on the following Senate Committees:  Judiciary; Medical Affairs; Legislative Oversight; Banking and Insurance; Interstate Cooperation; Fish, Game and Forestry; Education; and Ethics.  He is also a member of the Joint Citizens and Legislative Committee on Children and the Public Utilities Review Committee.

On May 11, 2017, Brad Hutto was the sole state Senator preventing the passage of a bill H3643 that would require universities funded by the state government to adopt the US State Department's definition of anti-Semitism. On May 4, 2018, Hutto effectively killed legislation in the Senate which would have banned 97% of abortions in the state of South Carolina. In November 2020, Hutto was selected as the Minority Leader of the South Carolina Senate succeeding Nikki G. Setzler.

References

External links

Brad Hutto for U.S. Senate campaign site
South Carolina Legislature - Senator C. Bradley Hutto official SC Senate website
Project Vote Smart - Senator C. Bradley 'Brad' Hutto (SC) profile
Follow the Money - Brad Hutto
2006 2004 2002 2000 1996 campaign contributions

|-

|-

1957 births
21st-century American politicians
Living people
Democratic Party South Carolina state senators
2014 South Carolina elections
2014 United States Senate elections